Dörsdorf is a municipality in the district of Rhein-Lahn, in Rhineland-Palatinate, in western Germany. It belongs to the community of Aar-Einrich.

Geography 
The place is about four kilometers southeast of Katzenelnbogen. The Dörsbach flows through the village.

Dörsdorf also belongs to the community of Weidgesmühle.

References

Municipalities in Rhineland-Palatinate
Rhein-Lahn-Kreis